The Poet Laureate of Mississippi is the poet laureate for the U.S. state of Mississippi.

List of Poets Laureate

External links
Poets Laureate of Mississippi at the Library of Congress

See also

 Poet laureate
 List of U.S. states' poets laureate
 United States Poet Laureate

References

 
Mississippi culture
American Poets Laureate